Adrián Garcia Uribe (born September 8, 1972) is a Mexican actor, comedian and television host. He is recognized for his roles as El Vítor, Carmelo and Poncho Aurelio at La hora pico, and for his co-lead role as Johnny in Mi corazón es tuyo. In 2020, he starred as the lead in Como tú no hay 2.

Filmography

Film

Television

References

External links 
 
 Adrián Uribe hizo fuerte revelación luego de estar al borde de la muerte | La Verdad Noticias

1972 births
Living people
Mexican male film actors
Mexican male television actors
Mexican male voice actors
Mexican comedians
Mexican television presenters
Mexican impressionists (entertainers)